Northern Pacific may refer to:

 Northern Pacific Airways, an upcoming airline
 Northern Pacific Field Hockey Conference, an NCAA Division I conference
 Northern Pacific Hockey League, an American Tier III junior ice hockey league
 Northern Pacific Railway, a defunct railroad

See also
 Northern Pacific Conference (disambiguation)
 Northern Pacific Depot (disambiguation)